Oleksandr Vorobiov (born October 5, 1984, in Dniprodzerzhynsk) is a Ukrainian gymnast. He won a bronze medal on rings at the 2008 Summer Olympics.

References

External links
 
 
 

1984 births
Living people
People from Kamianske
Ukrainian male artistic gymnasts
Olympic gymnasts of Ukraine
Gymnasts at the 2008 Summer Olympics
Olympic bronze medalists for Ukraine
Medalists at the World Artistic Gymnastics Championships
European champions in gymnastics
Olympic medalists in gymnastics
Medalists at the 2008 Summer Olympics
Laureates of the Prize of the Cabinet of Ministers of Ukraine for special achievements of youth in the development of Ukraine
Sportspeople from Dnipropetrovsk Oblast
21st-century Ukrainian people